In economics a spillover is an economic event in one context that occurs because of something else in a seemingly unrelated context.  For example, externalities of economic activity are non-monetary spillover effects upon non-participants. Odors from a rendering plant are negative spillover effects upon its neighbors; the beauty of a homeowner's flower garden is a positive spillover effect upon neighbors.

In the same way, the economic benefits of increased trade are the spillover effects anticipated in the formation of multilateral alliances of many of the regional nation states: e.g. SAARC (South Asian Association for Regional Cooperation), ASEAN (Association of South East Asian Nations).

In an economy in which some markets fail to clear, such failure can influence the demand or supply behavior of affected participants in other markets, causing their effective demand or effective supply to differ from their notional (unconstrained) demand or supply.

Another kind of spillover is generated by information. For example, when more information about someone generates more information about people related to her, and that information helps to eliminate asymmetries in information, then the spillover effects are positive (this issue has been found constantly in the economics and finance literature, see for instance the case of local banking markets).

History of the Concept
19th century economists John Stuart Mill and Henry Sidgwick are credited with founding the early concepts related to spillover effects. These ideas extend upon Adam Smith's famous ‘Invisible Hand’ theory which is a price that suggests prices can be naturally determined by the forces of supply and demand to form a market price and market quantity where buyers and sellers are willing to make a transaction. Spillover effects, also known as externalities in market theory are the costs associated with a transaction borne upon a party/parties that are non participants in the transaction (i.e., Production costs do not consider the cost of pollution on society at large). Furthermore, Mill argues that Government intervention in the market can be a useful tool when necessary to prevent or mitigate spillover effects when necessary as opposed to Adam Smith who believed a competitive market with little to no intervention provides the most adequate outcome.

These ideas on spillover effects later became extended upon further by other economists, notably Arthur Pigou. Pigou developed the concept of externalities in 1920 through ‘The Economics of Welfare’. Essentially, Pigou argued negative externalities (spillover) of an activity should incur an extra cost or tax while activities that produce a positive externalities (spillover) should be subsidized to further encourage this activity. Taxes on these activities that create negative externalities are used commonly in the 21st century through taxes including excise tax on purchasing alcohol and cigarettes which can cause damages to the health and wellbeing of citizens.

Types of Spillover effects
There are different types of spillover effects which can take place. According to the Corporate Finance Institute, spillover effects can be categorised in the following ways:
1. Social Interaction Spillover Effect
2. General Equilibrium Effect
3. Externalities Spillover Effect

Social Interaction Spillover Effect

Social interaction spillover effect occurs when community programs and initiatives have the effect of benefiting the welfare of people and in turn the community at large. For example, free education, social welfare payments and other public goods are designed to improve the social behaviour, education and employability of citizens which in turn could lower crime rates and poverty in the community in theory.

General Equilibrium Effects

General equilibrium effects can happen when there is an impact in the market either positively or negatively creating a spillover effect through interdependence of firms and households in the economy. This occurs as entities do not operate in a bubble, hence when there is a financial shock or boon to a business or industry, this impacts factors including pricing, costs and wages for other entities. Rather, entities experience shocks or boons in relation to other entities. For example, if there were to be a global shortage of oil production, global supply and demand would interact to put upward pressure on oil and in turn fuel prices. This occurs as consumers are effectively bidding for the remaining oil which is more scarce than before, forming a new equilibrium price in the market. Hence fuel stations and consumers are impacted by the spillover effect of oil shortages.

Externalities Spillover Effect

External spillover effects are similar to general equilibrium effects in that they impact third parties which are not directly participating in the transaction. However, the key difference is that externalities are represented by social costs that are not reflected in a price change without government intervention. An example of an externality may be pollution resulting from production of goods and services. This cost does not appear in the cost of production, rather it exists outside of the market supply and demand schedule.

Graphical representation

Externalities in the supply and demand curve: Note the graph representing a negative externality below. To illustrate this concept the ‘marginal social cost’ (MSC)  is used in comparison to the ‘marginal private cost’ (MPC). Marginal social cost is the line which includes all externalities including the social cost of pollution in addition to regular production costs. Alternatively, marginal private cost also considers the regular production costs used in a transaction. 

Thus, in the diagram below, if the market was functioning properly by accounting for negative externalities, society would produce at quantity 2 (Q2) and a higher price (P2). Without considering negative externalities,, society would produce at Quantity 1 (Q1) and at a lower price (P1). Hence, due to negative externalities (social costs) being excluded from transactions, society overproduces products with negative externalities and underprices them.

For positive externalities, see the diagram below. Note there are no social costs (negative externalities) that have been excluded from the private cost as there is a single cost line. In this case, social benefit (MSB) exceeds private benefit (MPB). In effect, this means the private benefit of a transaction (ie, profit for a newly established business) is only part of the benefit accrued as an additional social cost (ie, Surrounding cafes and restaurants gain more customers as employees from the newly established business buy lunch). Hence if the market was functioning properly to include social benefits, the market would produce at quantity 2 (Q2) and at price 2 (P2) which represents the true equilibrium quantity and prices.

Examples of spillover effects

The Great Depression

The Great Depression that began in 1929 is a significant example of how spillover effects can occur. Economists debate the exact cause of the Great Depression however, it is mostly regarded as a confluence of events including the stock market crash of 1929, banking panics and monetary contraction, decreased international lending and tariffs.

A contributing factor which led to the Great Depression and Spillover effects was the stock market crash of 1929. As the stock market boomed during the 1920’s it was regarded as a way to earn profit easily. However as investors began to purchase stock through loans, the stock market began overpriced and highly financed through investor debt. Once prices fell, investors rushed to sell stock in order to limit losses leading to the spillover effects of low consumer confidence and in turn low consumer spending, investment, production and high unemployment.

The COVID-19 Pandemic

A high profile example of spillover effects is the COVID-19 pandemic. The global economy has become more interdependent in the 21st century as globalisation has enhanced countries' reliance on other parts of the world for economic growth. Therefore, when the emergence of the pandemic forced countries to close their borders, this had a spillover effect, creating an economic shortfall. Studies from BIS Quarterly on spillover effects in the pandemic showed that confinement measures implemented by countries to limit the number of people contracting the virus showed there is no immunity from economic spillover and spillback effects between regions. The paper notes this is true even for regions that have domestic policy measures in place to reduce the impact of economic slowdown and are not economically immune from other countries without effective measures.

The Global Financial Crisis

The Global Financial Crisis is an example of how spillover effects occur both in terms of the mechanisms of a system but also geographically. Academics have found a correlation between the impact of a shock to a system and its impacts on other systems which have dependency. In the wake of the Global Financial Crisis many spillover effects occurred including a strong correlation between the volatility of the United States stock markets and other global markets. This impact shows how high default rates on home loans in the US did not have isolated impacts. Rather it resulted in spillover effects into equity markets domestically as well as internationally.

Influences on spillover effects

Globalisation

Globalisation has been a prominent influence on the economic spillover effect in the global economy. Due to rising economic interactions including trade and investment between economies, the likelihood has risen that events impact one economy will in turn impact others who have economic ties and dependencies. There are opposing views on the aggregate impact of globalisation as having either positive or negative spillover effects for the global economy. For instance, studies by Applied Economics journal indicates that globalisation has been impactful in promoting economic growth across nations in part due to the spillover.  However studies by find that despite there being evidence that there is a positive correlation between trade openness and carbon dioxide emissions (negative externality), there could also exist benefits from globalisation impacting the environment through factors including spread of technology and knowledge beyond borders.

Systems Built on Dependency

Systems in society are built on relationships and interactions that create mutual value for a wide range of stakeholders. This has created circumstances where impacts to one or more of these entities can spillover to the other entities that depend on the system. This can be examined in the Global Financial Crisis example of 2008. As banks granted loans to borrowers with a high chance of default, banks suffered from liquidity risk which led to significant macroeconomic impacts including losses for shareholders across all markets, significantly increased unemployment, bailouts from the Government and low investor and consumer confidence. Hence, entities like large banks can not operate in isolation, they are depended upon by many other entities in the financial system.

Trade Policy

In the same way that Financial crises and recessions can cause negative spillover effects through increased dependency between nations, trade policy can create positive spillover effects. It has been observed that one of the main positive spillover effects occurs as developing economies trade more with advanced economies leading to technology, information and investment flows (Dixon & O’Mahony, 2019). Data shows that China trading with more advanced economies has increased its access to new technology and information leading to improved competitiveness in global markets. It has been shown that there is a correlation between China’s trade activity with OECD nations and improved domestic productivity.

Foreign Direct Investment

Firms who seek to minimise costs in supply chains by using resources from overseas have been shown to invest in local infrastructure. This is classified as foreign direct investment. This dynamic is common as firms from advanced economies expand their production base overseas to take advantage of cheaper labor and capital costs. Studies have shown that foreign direct investment creates productivity gains as local infrastructure of a developing nation is invested into. Examples of how this may occur are a US corporation establishes a production site in Vietnam. Around this production site is the positive spillover of increased investment in local transport infrastructure as well as a food district for the workers.

See also
 Carbon leakage, in climate policy
Indirect land use change impacts of biofuels, in climate policy
 Knowledge spillover

References

Economic geography
Economic growth
Economics effects